Briery is an unincorporated community in Prince Edward County, Virginia, United States.

The Briery Church was listed on the National Register of Historic Places in 1969.

References

Unincorporated communities in Virginia
Unincorporated communities in Prince Edward County, Virginia